is a former Japanese football player.

Playing career
Nakazawa was born on January 7, 1972. After graduating from Hosei University, he joined J1 League club Urawa Reds in 1994. On December 4, he debuted as defender in 1994 Emperor's Cup. However he could not play at all in the match in 1995 and retired end of 1995 season.

Club statistics

References

External links

1972 births
Living people
Hosei University alumni
Japanese footballers
J1 League players
Urawa Red Diamonds players
Association football defenders